Keon Harding (born 1 November 1996) is a Barbadian cricketer. He made his international debut for the West Indies cricket team in January 2021.

Career
He made his List A debut for Combined Campuses and Colleges in the 2016–17 Regional Super50 on 24 January 2017. He made his first-class debut for Barbados in the 2016–17 Regional Four Day Competition on 23 March 2017. In October 2019, he was named in the West Indies Emerging Team for the 2019–20 Regional Super50 tournament.

In June 2020, Harding was named as one of eleven reserve players in the West Indies' Test squad, for their series against England. The Test series was originally scheduled to start in May 2020, but was moved back to July 2020 due to the COVID-19 pandemic. He made his Twenty20 debut on 5 September 2020, for the Barbados Tridents in the 2020 Caribbean Premier League.

In January 2021, Harding was added to the West Indies' One Day International (ODI) squad for their series against Bangladesh. He made his ODI debut for the West Indies, against Bangladesh, on 25 January 2021.

References

External links
 

1996 births
Living people
West Indies One Day International cricketers
Barbadian cricketers
Barbados cricketers
Barbados Royals cricketers
Combined Campuses and Colleges cricketers
West Indies Emerging Team cricketers
Place of birth missing (living people)